This page lists all described species of the spider family Udubidae accepted by the World Spider Catalog : The four genera of Udubidae plus Zorocrates formerly made up the family Zorocratidae.

Campostichomma

Campostichomma Karsch, 1892
 C. alawala Polotow & Griswold, 2017 — Sri Lanka
 C. harasbedda Polotow & Griswold, 2017 — Sri Lanka
 C. manicatum Karsch, 1892 (type) — Sri Lanka
 C. mudduk Polotow & Griswold, 2017 — Sri Lanka

Raecius

Raecius Simon, 1892
 R. aculeatus Dahl, 1901 — Congo
 R. asper (Thorell, 1899) — Cameroon, Equatorial Guinea (Bioko)
 R. congoensis Griswold, 2002 — Congo
 R. crassipes (L. Koch, 1875) (type) — Ethiopia
 R. jocquei Griswold, 2002 — Ivory Coast
 R. scharffi Griswold, 2002 — Tanzania

Uduba

Uduba Simon, 1880
 U. dahli Simon, 1903 — Madagascar
 U. evanescens (Dahl, 1901) — Madagascar
 U. madagascariensis (Vinson, 1863) (type) — Madagascar

Zorodictyna

Zorodictyna Strand, 1907
 Z. inhonesta (Simon, 1906) (type) — Madagascar
 Z. oswaldi (Lenz, 1891) — Madagascar

References

Udubidae